Garczyn is a PKP railway station in Garczyn (Pomeranian Voivodeship), Poland.

Lines crossing the station

References 
Garczyn article at Polish Stations Database , URL accessed at 29 March 2006

Railway stations in Pomeranian Voivodeship
Kościerzyna County